Thielemann is a German surname. Notable people with the surname include:

Alfred Thielemann (1869–1954), Norwegian sport shooter
Christian Thielemann (born 1959), German conductor
Ferdinand Thielemann (1803–1863), Danish architect
Friedrich-Karl Thielemann (born 1951), German/Swiss theoretical astrophysicist
Heino Thielemann (1923–2015), German field hockey player
R. C. Thielemann (born 1955), former American football player
Ronny Thielemann (born 1973), former German football player
Ursula Thielemann (born 1960), former German field hockey player

See also
17882 Thielemann, main-belt asteroid, named after John Seth Thielemann (born 1986)

German-language surnames

de:Thielemann